Joseph George Leopold Marcel Fillion (May 28, 1922 – May 15, 1998) was a Canadian professional ice hockey left winger who played in one National Hockey League game for the Boston Bruins during the 1944–45 NHL season, on March 18, 1945, against the Montreal Canadiens. The rest of his career, which lasted from 1940 to 1954, was spent in different minor leagues. Marcel is the brother of Bob Fillion.

Career statistics

Regular season and playoffs

See also
List of players who played only one game in the NHL

External links

1922 births
1998 deaths
Boston Bruins players
Boston Olympics players
Canadian ice hockey left wingers
Ice hockey people from Quebec
Providence Reds players
Shawinigan-Falls Cataracts (QSHL) players
Sportspeople from Thetford Mines